Most Wanted is the third solo concert by Filipino actor and singer Daniel Padilla, as support of his third full-length studio album, I Feel Good. On June 13, 2015 at the Mall of Asia Arena, Padilla sang 14 songs in total. These featured songs from his latest album, "Fly Me to the Moon", "How Sweet It Is (To be Loved by You)", and "Isn't She Lovely". He also sang duets, "Moon River" with KZ Tandingan, "Nothing’s Gonna Stop Us Now" with "The Voice of the Philippines" finalist Morissette Amon, "Moondance" with Kyla, and "So Real So Good" with Kathryn Bernardo. Other guests included Your Face Sounds Familiar finalists Nyoy Volante and Edgar Allan Guzman and the Harana Boys.

Concerts
Padilla held a press conference for his "Most Wanted" concert at Dong Juan in Quezon City, on June 6, 2015. The concert, held on June 13, 2015, was Padilla's first concert at the SM MoA Arena and also the first time to be directed by Johnny Manahan with musical direction by Marvin Querido.

Padilla opened his concert with his song. His first guest was X Factor Philippines champion KZ Tandingan. He sang the duets "Moon River" and "Quando Quando" with her. While he went backstage, KZ Tandingan sang a solo, "Till I Met You". The next guests, Your Face Sounds Familiar finalists Nyoy Volante and Edgar Allan Guzman, sang Maroon 5's "She Will Be Loved". A recording that showed Padilla's career in 2015 played, with the caption "Crazy and Beautiful". Then he sang his soundtrack contribution for his movie Crazy Beautiful You, "Nothing's Gonna Stop Us Now", featuring Morissette Amon.

After singing "What a Wonderful World", Padilla asked everyone to retweet the selfie that he took during his concert. He revealed that for every retweet, Pepsi Philippines will donate $1 to lighting projects that will benefit an Aeta community in Tarlac.

Padilla and Harana Boys then sang Eraserhead's songs. Padilla then sang his remake of VST & Co.'s "Ikaw Ang Aking Mahal". During this song, Bernardo's picture was revealed on the screen. The next guest was Kyla, with whom Padilla sang the duet "Moon Dance". Then Padilla greeted Vice Ganda, who was sitting in the front row, and sang "How Sweet It Is To Be Loved By You". The next guest is Gary Valenciano, who performed solo on stage. The last guest was Kathryn Bernardo, with whom Padilla shared the stage for "So Real So Good".

Unfortunately, Padilla was not able to perform his final song, "For Once in My Life", because the fans had become unruly, swarming the stage and forcing security to step in and whisk their idol backstage.

During this event, the actor announced that his fourth studio album, titled I Feel Good, was already available.

In media
Unlike his previous concert that only streamed live via Sky Cable's pay per view services in Metro Manila, Laguna, Rizal, Bacolod, Dumaguete, at General Santos City, this concert also streamed live in the cinemas of malls in Davao, Cebu, Iloilo, Cabanatuan, Pampanga, and Legazpi. The Most Wanted concert also could be played during a limited period from ABS-CBNmobile-powered mobile devices.

Setlist

Concert dates

Guests

Personnel
 Artists: Daniel Padilla 
 Concert organizer: ABS-CBN
 Concert promoter: Star Events
 Director: Johnny Manahan 
 Musical Director: Marvin Querido

Notes

References

Daniel Padilla concert tours
2015 concerts